Quaregnon is a municipality of Wallonia located in the province of Hainaut, Belgium. 

On 1 January 2018 Quaregnon had a total population of 19,006. The total area is 11.08 km² which gives a population density of 1,716 inhabitants per km².

The municipality consists of the following districts: Quaregnon and Wasmuel.

See also 
 Charter of Quaregnon

References

External links
 

 
Municipalities of Hainaut (province)